Gentlemen's Fury is a 2017 comedy film written, produced, and directed by Ben Sharples and Marissa Hall, and starring Sharples, Jake Head, and Audrey Ellis Fox. Its plot follows a professional tennis player who is kicked off the tour for punching an opponent then recruited to play in a secret league that is part Fight Club, part Dodgeball. It was released on video on demand.

Plot 
The movie begins with professional tennis player Aaron Faust (Sharples) playing an exhibition match at the estate of the late Mickey Rooney. Despite the fact that the match is for a good cause "benefitting underprivileged children," Aaron has a John McEnroe-like meltdown over a line call then punches his opponent who finds Faust's Achilles heel when he taunts him for playing a “pussy sport.”  

Banned from the ATP tour, dumped by his fiancé, and sentenced to anger management, Aaron is blindsided by the sudden turn his life has taken and laments that "tennis is missing something" but doesn't quite know what it is. Julie (Fox), a fellow anger management participant, aroused by Aaron's "bad-ass" on-court behavior, introduces him to Dwayne (Head), an intense and charismatic tennis zealot who is also "star-struck" by Aaron and immediately tries to recruit him for an underground tennis league called Gentlemen's Fury. Gentlemen's Fury is Dwayne's answer to tennis’ image problem, and also, he promises, just what Aaron needs to turn his life around.

Though hesitant at first, Aaron is excited to learn that Gentlemen's Fury is made up of other former pros who were excused from the tour for questionable behavior and that the league takes significant liberties with the rules of tennis, essentially turning it into a contact sport, so he joins the squad. But Aaron begins to realize as he gets deeper and deeper involved in this cult-like club that Gentlemen's Fury might not be all it's cracked up to be. The pay is good, but the rules are a little vague and, it turns out, increasingly dangerous. Dwayne, in true cult leader fashion, transforms from a guy spouting a new tennis utopia into a crazed psychopath with more than one homicide on his hands, while Aaron struggles at first to keep up, then just to survive.

Cast 
 Ben Sharples as Aaron Faust
 Jake Head as Dwayne
 Audrey Ellis Fox as Julie
 Kyle Leibovitch as Fabricio
 Taishi Mizuno as Helicopter
 Scotty Tovar as Memo
 J.B. Bauersfeld as Rudy Nudeo
 Raheem Williams as Juggler

Allusions to actual players 
Gentlemen's Fury makes tongue in cheek references to several actual ATP players who had infamous incidents that resulted in their suspension from the sport, including McEnroe, Bernard Tomic, Nikolai Davydenko, Jeff Tarango, Wayne Odesnik, and Richard Gasquet.

Production 
Gentlemen's Fury began principal photography on June 1, 2015 after a successful Kickstarter campaign.  The film was shot over 18 days, mostly in Santa Monica and Manhattan Beach. League scenes were filmed at Studios 60 in Los Angeles. Post production occurred over the next year and a half.

Distribution 

The filmmakers took Gentlemen's Fury to the 2016 American Film Market, where they received 15 offers from various distribution companies and sales agents. But upon looking at the fine print with their attorney, they decided to turn them all down and self-distribute.

Release 
Gentlemen's Fury premiered on May 23, 2017, on Vimeo On Demand. It was released on iTunes on November 10, 2017. The film was released on Amazon on November 24, 2017.

Series 
The series Gentlemen's Fury: Reloaded is scheduled for release in early 2023.

References

External links 
 Official website
 Gentlemen's Fury on IMDb

2010s English-language films